The Adjutant General of New York is the highest-ranking military official in the New York National Guard as the state adjutant general.  The adjutant general is part of the state government's executive branch, and serves as head of the New York State Division of Military and Naval Affairs, which includes the New York Army National Guard, New York Air National Guard, the New York Guard, and the New York Naval Militia.

Adjutants general were originally selected by the state Council of Appointment.  Since 1822 the adjutant general has been appointed by the Governor of New York. Adjutants general serve a four-year term and hold the rank of major general.  In 1948, a newly-enacted law designated the senior National Guard leader in New York as Chief of Staff to the Governor.  Legislation passed in 1988 changed the title back to adjutant general.

The first adjutant general of New York was Nicholas Fish, who was appointed on April 13, 1784.  The current holder of the position is Raymond F. Shields Jr., who was appointed in 2018.

Adjutants General of New York

71. Raymond F. Shields Jr., since 2018
70. Anthony P. German, 2016–2018
69. Patrick A. Murphy, 2010–2016
68. Joseph J. Taluto, 2006–2010
67. Thomas P. Maguire, 2001–2006
66. John H. Fenimore V, 1995–2001
65. Michael S. Hall, 1992–1995
64. Lawrence P. Flynn, 1986–1992
63. Vito J. Castellano, 1975–1986
62. John C. Baker, 1971–1975
61. Almerin C. O'Hara, 1959–1971
60. Ronald C. Brock, 1957–1959
59. Karl F. Hausauer, 1949–1957
58. Ames T. Brown, 1940–1949
57. Walter G. Robinson, 1934–1940
56. Franklin W. Ward, 1926–1934
55. Edward J. Westcott, 1923–1926
54. Charles W. Berry, 1923
53. J. Leslie Kincaid, 1920–1923
52. Charles W. Berry, 1919–1920
51. Charles H. Sherrill, 1917–1918
50. Lewis Stotesbury, 1915–1917
49. Henry DeWitt Hamilton, 1913–1915
48. William Verbeck, 1910–1913
47. Nelson H. Henry, 1902–1910
46. Frederick Phisterer, 1901–1902
45. Edwin M. Hoffman, 1900–1901
44. Avery D. Andrews, 1899–1900
43. C. Whitney Tillinghast 2nd, 1897–1899
42. Edwin A. McAlpin, 1895–1897
41. Thomas H. McGrath, 1894–1895
40. Josiah Porter, 1886–1894
39. John G. Farnsworth, 1883–1886
38. Frederick Townsend, 1880–1883
37. John B. Woodward, 1879–1880
36. Franklin Townsend, 1875–1879
35. John F. Rathbone, 1873–1875
34. Franklin Townsend, 1869–1873
33. Selden E. Marvin, 1867–1869
32. William Irvine, 1865–1867
31. John T. Sprague, 1863–1865
30. Thomas Hillhouse, 1861–1863
29. John Meredith Read Jr., 1861
28. Frederick Townsend, 1857–1861
27. Robert H. Pruyn, 1855–1857
26. John Watts de Peyster, 1855
25. Isaac Vanderpoel, 1854–1855
24. Robert E. Temple, 1853–1854
23. L. Ward Smith, 1851–1853
22. Samuel Stevens, 1847–1851
21. Robert E. Temple, 1846–1847
20. Thomas Farrington, 1845–1846
19. Archibald C. Niven, 1844–1845
18. Lyman Sanford, 1843–1844
17. Rufus King, 1839–1843
16. Allan MacDonald, 1835–1837
15. Thomas W. Harman, 1835–1837
14. Levi Hubbell, 1833–1835
13. John Adams Dix, 1831–1833
12. Matthew H. Webster, 1830–1831
11. Nicholas F. Beck, 1825–1830
10. Charles G. Haines, 1824–1825
9. William K. Fuller, 1823–1824
8. William L. Marcy, 1821–1823
7. Solomon Van Rensselaer, 1813–1821
6. William Paulding Jr., 1811–1813
5. Solomon Van Rensselaer, 1810–1811
4. William Paulding Jr., 1809–1810
3. Solomon Van Rensselaer, 1801–1809
2. David Van Horne, 1793–1801
1. Nicholas Fish, 1784–1793. He was appointed as the first Adjutant General of New York on April 13, 1784.

References

Sources

Books

Internet

Newspapers

Adjutants General of New York (state)
State agencies of New York (state)